Waskito Sujarwoko (born February 4, 1984) is an Indonesian footballer who currently plays for Arema FC in the Indonesia Super League.

References

External links

1984 births
Association football defenders
Living people
Indonesian footballers
Liga 1 (Indonesia) players
Arema F.C. players
Indonesian Premier Division players
Persekam Metro players